Jorge Diaz is a Mexican-American actor. He has had roles in the films Paranormal Activity: The Marked Ones and The 33, and the drama miniseries The Long Road Home.

Career 
Diaz had recurring roles in the television shows Days of Our Lives, Jane the Virgin and the Hulu drama East Los High, and has provided voice work for the animated shows Elena of Avalor, The Lion Guard, and Lost in Oz. His guest appearances include roles in Arrested Development and The Good Place.

Background
He is of Mexican descent.

Filmography

Film

Television

Videogames

References

External links
 

Living people
American male actors of Mexican descent
American male film actors
American male television actors
American male voice actors
Male actors from Los Angeles
Place of birth missing (living people)
Year of birth missing (living people)